Opet sam se zaljubio (English translation: I Fell in Love Again) is the ninth studio album of Bosnian singer Halid Bešlić. It was released in 1990.

Track listing
More i planine (The Sea and Mountains)
Sarajevo, grade moj (Sarajevo, My Town)
Opet sam se zaljubio (I Fell in Love Again)
Lete ptice, lete jata (The Birds Are Flying, the Flock is Flying)
Gordana
Zlatna čaša (Golden Cups)
Zlatne niti (Golden Thread)
Sumorne jeseni (Gloomy Autumns)

References

Halid Bešlić albums
1990 albums